Jaime Rios is a judge on the New York Supreme Court for Queens County. Prior to sitting on the Supreme Court, Judge Rios served on the New York City Civil Court and the Housing Court. Judge Rios holds a B.S. degree from City College of New York, a M.A. degree from New York University, and a law degree from Fordham University School of Law. Following law school, Judge Rios was a prosecutor in Kings County and later an attorney for the New York City Police Department. He also teaches landlord/tenant law at Fordham as an adjunct professor. He is also a co-chair of Fordham's Minority Mentorship Program for law students.
Judge Rios retired from the bench in December, 2013.  Many attorneys mourned his retirement, noting that he was a consistent and fair jurist whose understanding of the law was generally above reproach.

Tyronne Johnson case
In 2005, Judge Rios' conduct in the second murder trial of Tyronne Johnson came under scrutiny. Johnson's first conviction for the murder of nightclub owner Leroy Vann was overturned by Judge Rios when it was revealed that a prosecutor lied about the whereabouts of a defense witness. Judith Memblatt, the judge's former law clerk, accused him of improperly coaching the prosecutor in the second trial, Eugene Riebstein. Based on Memblatt's allegations, Johnson's defense attorney Ron Kuby sought to overturn this second conviction. In support of the motion to vacate the conviction, Kuby took the unorthodox step of calling Judge Rios as a witness to address the allegation, but Rios denied any misconduct. A side issue in the case is Memblatt's further allegation of a sexual affair between former prosecutor Meryl Lutsky and the married Rios which, in Memblatt's words, made him "unfit" to be a judge. The affair, and Memblatt's subsequent firing, prompted the tabloid New York Post to call Rios the "Love Judge." Memblatt has gone on to become a blogger highly critical of the New York state judiciary as a whole. In October 2006, Judge Matthew D'Emic denied Johnson's motion to overturn the conviction, finding no misconduct on Rios' part.

See also  
 List of Hispanic/Latino American jurists
 List of first minority male lawyers and judges in New York

References

External links
Hon. Jaime Rios, New York State Unified Court System

Fordham University School of Law alumni
New York (state) state court judges
Year of birth missing (living people)
Living people
Hispanic and Latino American judges